Columbia Lake is a small lake southeast of Stilesville in Delaware County, New York. It drains southeast via an unnamed creek that flows into Silver Lake.

See also
 List of lakes in New York

References 

Lakes of New York (state)
Lakes of Delaware County, New York